Jaroslava Bajerová (1 April 1910 – 23 August 1995) was a Czaechoslovak artistic gymnast who competed in the 1936 Summer Olympics where she won the silver medal as member of the Czechoslovak gymnastics team. She was also a member of the Czechoslovak team that won the gold medal at the 1934 World Championships.

References

External links
 
 

1910 births
1995 deaths
Czechoslovak female artistic gymnasts
Olympic gymnasts of Czechoslovakia
Gymnasts at the 1936 Summer Olympics
Olympic silver medalists for Czechoslovakia
Olympic medalists in gymnastics
Sportspeople from Brno
Medalists at the 1936 Summer Olympics